The Guildhall and Stonebow, Lincoln, has been the meeting place of Lincoln City Council from Medieval times to the present. The term Stonebow, which is derived from the Danish word stennibogi, indicates a stone archway that visitors entering the city from the south, along the High Street, would have passed through. It is a Grade I listed building. Lincoln City Hall, a 20th-century building on Orchard Street, provides further accommodation for the city council.

History

The first gateway on the site, which formed the southern gateway to the City on Lincoln on Ermine Street, the main road from London to York, was completed in the early 211 AD. The gateway would have become known as the Stonebow, which is derived from the Danish word stennibogi, some time after the Viking invasion of England in the late 8th century. The Guildhall, which had been located in the south east corner of the city, was moved to a new location over the Stonebow in 1237. In 1386 King Richard II presented a sword to city officials who ensured that it was displayed in the building. The Guildhall and Stonebow were demolished in the late 14th century but, due to a shortage of funds, the present building was only completed around 1520.

Sometime about 1840 the Lincoln architect W. A. Nicholson  made extensive alterations to the east end of the Stonebow, when the building that housed the old City prison was pulled down. Nicholson observed that the Roman wall of the Lower Colonia in Lincoln was to the north of the Stonebow and was still standing to the height of about 15 feet. This suggests that the Stonebow was a barbican, that had been built forward of the Roman southern gateway. Nicholson appears to have been the architect responsible for the present building to the east of the Stonebow completed about 1844 which now contains the Mayor's Parlour and the display of civic regalia. Further alterations took place 1885–90 by the architect J. L. Pearson, who was responsible for alterations on the west side of the Stonebow. Pearson created an additional passageway arch and the shop units under the arch.

The Guildhall, which is on the first floor of the building and which remains the meeting place of Lincoln City Council, won the "Best Story Told Award" from Visit England in 2019.

Architecture

The Stonebow is built from the local limestone. The exterior has crenellated parapets on both sides. South front has a roll moulded segmental central arch flanked by single round buttresses with canopied niches containing figures. Above, a tablet with pilaster surround with the arms of James I, and above again, two two-light mullioned windows. Over them, there is a stepped gable containing a clock. On either side of the main arch there are two walkway arches, those to the right original, with hoodmoulds.

The North side has a plainer central arch, flanked by a single walkway arch to left and two to the right. Over the inner archways, small two-light windows. Above, three two-light pointed arched windows and parapet gable with clock.

Interior

The interior of the guildhall has the council chamber on the first floor, which has a strutted king post roof with arch braces to the purlins in the outer bays. The tie beams have bosses. There is mid-18th century panelling with the coat of arms of George II, which is set behind the Mayor's chair, below a segmental pediment on Corinthian columns. Possibly the most impressive feature is the wide table around which the councillors sit. As the size of the council has been increased in recent years, additional seating has had to be added at the east end. The council is summoned to its meeting by the motte bell which dates from the 14th century.

Gallery

References

Sources

Stoker D.A.(     ) The Lincoln Stonebow and the Flattery of Princes Journal of the British Archaeological Association. Vol 150, pp 96–105.

External links 

History of Lincoln, England
Buildings and structures in Lincoln, England
Grade I listed buildings in Lincolnshire
Government buildings completed in 1520
City and town halls in Lincolnshire